Tatiana Andrianova may refer to:
 Tatyana Andrianova (born 1979), Russian middle-distance runner
 Tatiana Andrianova (organist) (born 1972), Russian concert organist